Goodenough Island Rural LLG is a local-level government (LLG) of Milne Bay Province, Papua New Guinea.

Wards
01. Waibula
02. Ufaufa
03. Watuluma Upper
04. Watuluma Lower
05. Idakamenai
06. Ulutuya
07. Wakonai
08. Vivigani
09. Eweli
10. Kalauna
11. Belebele
12. Mataita West
13. Mataita East
14. Faiava
15. Ufu'ufu
16. Bwadoga East
17. Bwadoga West
18. Wagifa
19. Abolu
20. Kilia
21. Lauwela
22. Awale
23. Utalo
24. Diodio
25. Yauyaula
26. Awaya
27. Ibawana
28. Kalimtabutabu

References

Local-level governments of Milne Bay Province